The Tornillo-Guadalupe International Bridge is an international bridge which crosses the Rio Grande connecting the United States–Mexico border towns of Tornillo, Texas and Guadalupe, Chihuahua.   The bridge was built in 2016 to replace and upgrade the Fabens–Caseta International Bridge a few hundred yards to the west. The new bridge bypasses the village of Caseta.

Border crossing

The Marcelino Serna Port of Entry opened on November 17, 2014.  The new crossing is built around a six-lane bridge about 1800 feet west of the previous two-lane Fabens–Caseta International Bridge and can accommodate vehicular, pedestrian and commercial traffic. The U.S. Customs and Border Protection (CBP) facility at the crossing served as the site for the Tornillo tent city, which housed as many as 2,800 detained migrant youths from June 2018 to January 2019. As of July 2019, a 2,500-bed holding facility for adult migrants is under construction at the site.

References

International bridges in Texas
International bridges in Chihuahua (state)
Toll bridges in Texas
Bridges completed in 2016
Transportation buildings and structures in El Paso County, Texas
Road bridges in Texas
Toll bridges in Mexico
Tornillo-Guadalupe Bridge
Tornillo-Guadalupe Bridge